7α-Thiospironolactone (7α-TS; developmental code name SC-24813; also known as deacetylspironolactone) is a steroidal antimineralocorticoid and antiandrogen of the spirolactone group and a minor active metabolite of spironolactone. Other important metabolites of spironolactone include 7α-thiomethylspironolactone (7α-TMS; SC-26519), 6β-hydroxy-7α-thiomethylspironolactone (6β-OH-7α-TMS), and canrenone (SC-9376).

Spironolactone is a prodrug with a short terminal half-life of 1.4 hours. The active metabolites of spironolactone have extended terminal half-lives of 13.8 hours for 7α-TMS, 15.0 hours for 6β-OH-7α-TMS, and 16.5 hours for canrenone, and accordingly, these metabolites are responsible for the therapeutic effects of the drug.

7α-TS and 7α-TMS have been found to possess approximately equivalent affinity for the rat ventral prostate androgen receptor (AR) relative to that of spironolactone. The affinity of 7α-TS, 7α-TMS, and spironolactone for the rat prostate AR is about 3.0 to 8.5% of that of dihydrotestosterone (DHT).

7α-TS, via a reactive metabolite formed by 17α-hydroxylase, is a suicide inhibitor of 17α-hydroxylase, and is thought to be involved in the inhibition of 17α-hydroxylase by spironolactone.

A study assessed the interaction of spironolactone and 7α-TS with sex hormone-binding globulin and found that they had very low affinity for this carrier protein.

See also
 7α-Thioprogesterone

References

Further reading
 

Antimineralocorticoids
Human drug metabolites
Lactones
Organosulfur compounds
Pregnanes
Spiro compounds
Spirolactones
Spironolactone
Steroidal antiandrogens